Marlon Fung (born July 26, 1990), better known by his stage name Issa Gold, is an American rapper from Brooklyn, New York.  He is one half of the hip hop duo The Underachievers, along with AK. In 2014 the rapper considered leaving a career in rap but was short lived.

Musical career 
In 2011, Issa Gold and AKTHESAVIOR formed the hip hop duo The Underachievers. Issa Gold and The Underachievers went on to work with other notable hip hop groups and figures such as; Denzel Curry, Flatbush Zombies, and Pro Era.

Discography

MIXTAPES (solo) 
 Conversations With A Butterfly (2014)

ALBUMS (solo) 
 Tempus (2021)
 Tempus Act II: Mirrors (2022)

Studio albums (with The Underachievers)

EPs (with The Underachievers)

Mixtapes (with The Underachievers)

References

Rappers from Brooklyn
1990 births
People from Flatbush, Brooklyn
Living people
21st-century American rappers
Beast Coast members